The 2013–14 Cleveland Cavaliers season was the 44th season of the franchise in the National Basketball Association (NBA). It would be the team's last losing record until the 2018–2019 season and the team's last season before re-signing LeBron James.

Key dates
 April 18, 2013 – Fired head coach Byron Scott.
 April 24 – Hired Mike Brown as head coach.
 June 27 – The 2013 NBA draft took place in Brooklyn, New York, at the Barclays Center.
 July 12 – Signed Jarrett Jack and Earl Clark.
 July 19 – Signed Andrew Bynum; waived Kevin Jones and Chris Quinn.
 August 1 – Signed Carrick Felix.
 August 2 – Signed Sergey Karasev.
 August 20 – Signed Anthony Bennett.
 September 13 – Signed Matthew Dellavedova.
 September 30 – Signed Jermaine Taylor, Kenny Kadji, Henry Sims, Michael Lee, Elliot Williams and DeSagana Diop.
 October 19 – Waived Michael Lee.
 October 23 – Exercised third-year options on Dion Waiters and Tyler Zeller; exercised fourth-year options on Kyrie Irving and Tristan Thompson.
 October 25 – Waived Jermaine Taylor, Kenny Kadji, Elliot Williams and DeSagana Diop.
 December 5 – Assigned  Henry Sims and Carrick Felix to the Canton Charge of the NBA D-League.
 December 9 – Recalled  Henry Sims and Carrick Felix from the Canton Charge.
 December 11 – Assigned  Henry Sims, Sergey Karasev and Carrick Felix to the Canton Charge.
 December 12 – Recalled  Henry Sims, Sergey Karasev and Carrick Felix from the Canton Charge.
 December 27 – Assigned  Sergey Karasev to the Canton Charge.
 December 28 – Suspended  Andrew Bynum indefinitely for conduct detrimental to the team.
 December 30 – Recalled  Sergey Karasev from the Canton Charge.
 January 6, 2014 –Acquired Luol Deng from the Chicago Bulls in exchange for Andrew Bynum, three future draft picks and the right to swap 2015 first round picks (1–14 protected).
 January 15 – Assigned  Carrick Felix to the Canton Charge.
 January 21 – Recalled  Carrick Felix from the Canton Charge.
 January 22 – Assigned Sergey Karasev and Carrick Felix to the Canton Charge.
 January 26 – Recalled Sergey Karasev and Carrick Felix from the Canton Charge.
 January 29 – Dion Waiters selected to play in the 2014 NBA Rising Stars Challenge; Assigned Sergey Karasev to the Canton Charge.
 February 6 – Fired general manager Chris Grant  ; Kyrie Irving selected to participate in the 2014 NBA All-Star Weekend Three-Point Shootout.
 February 12 – Recalled Sergey Karasev from the Canton Charge.
 February 18 – Assigned Sergey Karasev to the Canton Charge.
 February 19 – Recalled Sergey Karasev from the Canton Charge.
 February 20 –Acquired Spencer Hawes from the Philadelphia 76ers in exchange for Henry Sims, Earl Clark and two future second round draft picks.
 February 22 –Signed Arinze Onuaku to 10-day contract.
 March 3 –Signed Arinze Onuaku to second 10-day contract.
 March 5 – Assigned Sergey Karasev to the Canton Charge.
 March 11 – Retired  Zydrunas Ilgauskas's jersey (#11);. Recalled Sergey Karasev to the Canton Charge.
 March 11 – Assigned Sergey Karasev to the Canton Charge.
 March 12 –  Arinze Onuaku's contract expired; Signed Shane Edwards to 10-day contract.
 March 18 – Recalled Sergey Karasev from the Canton Charge.
 March 21 – Shane Edwards' 10-day contract expired; Signed Seth Curry to 10-day contract.
 March 30 –  Seth Curry's 10-day contract expired.
 March 31 – Signed Scotty Hopson to multi-year contract.
 April 6 – Assigned Sergey Karasev and Scotty Hopson to the Canton Charge.
 April 9 – Recalled Sergey Karasev and Scotty Hopson from the Canton Charge.
 April 10 – Assigned Sergey Karasev and Scotty Hopson to the Canton Charge.
 April 12 – Recalled Sergey Karasev from the Canton Charge.
 April 15 – Luol Deng won the J. Walter Kennedy Citizenship Award; Recalled Scotty Hopson from the Canton Charge.

Draft picks

Roster

Pre-season

|- style="background:#cfc;"
| 1
| October 8
| Milwaukee
| 
| Tristan Thompson (17)
| Varejão & Bennett (10)
| Jarrett Jack (5)
| Quicken Loans Arena9,022
| 1–0
|- style="background:#cfc;"
| 2
| October 11
| @ Orlando
| 
| Dion Waiters (21)
| Tristan Thompson (8)
| Kyrie Irving (5)
| Amway Center13,611
| 2–0
|- style="background:#fcc;"
| 3
| October 15
| Charlotte
| 
| Irving & Miles (15)
| Henry Sims (9)
| Matthew Dellavedova (7)
| Canton Memorial Civic Center4,047
| 2–1
|- style="background:#cfc;"
| 4
| October 17
| Detroit
| 
| Irving & Taylor (15)
| Anderson Varejão (11)
| Matthew Dellavedova (8)
| Quicken Loans Arena12,679
| 3–1
|- style="background:#fcc;"
| 5
| October 19
| Indiana
| 
| Kyrie Irving (15)
| Anthony Bennett (10)
| Irving & Dellavedova (5)
| Quicken Loans Arena14,760
| 3–2
|- style="background:#cfc;"
| 6
| October 21
| Philadelphia
| 
| Kyrie Irving (17)
| Tristan Thompson (16)
| Kyrie Irving (12)
| Schottenstein Center11,276
| 4–2
|- style="background:#fcc;"
| 7
| October 23
| Washington
| 
| Kyrie Irving (19)
| Tristan Thompson (14)
| Jarrett Jack (5)
| U.S. Bank Arena7,528
| 4–3
|- style="background:#fcc;"
| 8
| October 24
| @ Charlotte
| 
| Kyrie Irving (20)
| Thompson & Sims (8)
| Jarrett Jack (4)
| Time Warner Cable Arena5,936
| 4–4

Regular season

Standings

Game log

|- style="background:#cfc;"
| 1
| October 30
| Brooklyn
| 
| Tristan Thompson (18)
| Tristan Thompson (9)
| Kyrie Irving (9)
| Quicken Loans Arena20,562
| 1–0

|- style="background:#fcc;"
| 2
| November 1
| @ Charlotte
| 
| C. J. Miles (22)
| Tristan Thompson (11)
| Kyrie Irving (7)
| Time Warner Cable Arena18,017
| 1–1
|- style="background:#fcc;"
| 3
| November 2
| @ Indiana
| 
| Dion Waiters (17)
| Earl Clark (7)
| Kyrie Irving (5)
| Bankers Life Fieldhouse16,242
| 1–2
|- style="background:#cfc;"
| 4
| November 4
| Minnesota
| 
| C. J. Miles (19)
| Tristan Thompson (11)
| Kyrie Irving (6)
| Quicken Loans Arena17,892
| 2–2
|- style="background:#fcc;"
| 5
| November 6
| @ Milwaukee
| 
| Kyrie Irving (29)
| Anderson Varejão (8)
| Kyrie Irving (8)
| BMO Harris Bradley Center14,340
| 2–3
|- style="background:#fcc;"
| 6
| November 8
| @ Philadelphia
| 
| Dion Waiters (18)
| Tristan Thompson (16)
| Kyrie Irving (9)
| Wells Fargo Center15,219
| 2–4
|- style="background:#cfc;"
| 7
| November 9
| Philadelphia
| 
| Kyrie Irving (39)
| Thompson & Varejão (10)
| Kyrie Irving (12)
| Quicken Loans Arena20,562
| 3–4
|- style="background:#fcc;"
| 8
| November 11
| @ Chicago
| 
| Kyrie Irving (16)
| Tristan Thompson (13)
| Kyrie Irving (4)
| United Center21,778
| 3–5
|- style="background:#fcc;"
| 9
| November 13
| @ Minnesota
| 
| Kyrie Irving (20)
| Thompson & Zeller (6)
| Jarrett Jack (5)
| Target Center14,978
| 3–6
|- style="background:#fcc;"
| 10
| November 15
| Charlotte
| 
| Kyrie Irving (18)
| Anderson Varejão (13)
| Kyrie Irving (10)
| Quicken Loans Arena18,679
| 3–7
|- style="background:#cfc;"
| 11
| November 16
| @ Washington
| 
| Kyrie Irving (41)
| Tristan Thompson (12)
| Anderson Varejão (6)
| Verizon Center18,038
| 4–7
|- style="background:#fcc;"
| 12
| November 20
| Washington
| 
| Kyrie Irving (28)
| Anderson Varejão (11)
| Irving & Jack (6)
| Quicken Loans Arena16,189
| 4–8
|- style="background:#fcc;"
| 13
| November 22
| @ New Orleans
| 
| Kyrie Irving (22)
| Anderson Varejão (9)
| Bynum & Jack (4)
| New Orleans Arena15,186
| 4–9
|- style="background:#fcc;"
| 14
| November 23
| @ San Antonio
| 
| Andrew Bynum (16)
| Tristan Thompson (9)
| Jarrett Jack (5)
| AT&T Center18,581
| 4–10
|- style="background:#fcc;"
| 15
| November 27
| Miami
| 
| Dion Waiters (24)
| Tristan Thompson (11)
| Jarrett Jack (6)
| Quicken Loans Arena20,562
| 4–11
|- style="background:#fcc;"
| 16
| November 29
| @ Boston
| 
| Dion Waiters (21)
| Anderson Varejão (12)
| Dion Waiters (6)
| TD Garden17,685
| 4–12
|- style="background:#cfc;"
| 17
| November 30
| Chicago
| 
| Waiters & Bynum (20)
| Tristan Thompson (14)
| Kyrie Irving (6)
| Quicken Loans Arena17,296
| 5–12

|- style="background:#cfc;"
| 18
| December 4
| Denver
| 
| Kyrie Irving (23)
| Tristan Thompson (21)
| Dion Waiters (6)
| Quicken Loans Arena14,642
| 6–12
|- style="background:#fcc;"
| 19
| December 6, 2013
| @ Atlanta
| 
| Dion Waiters (30)
| Andrew Bynum (13)
| Varejão, Irving & Dellavedova (4)
| Philips Arena13,282
| 6–13
|- style="background:#cfc;"
| 20
| December 7
| L.A. Clippers
| 
| Irving & Thompson (20)
| Anderson Varejão (17)
| Kyrie Irving (6)
| Quicken Loans Arena16,216
| 7–13
|- style="background:#cfc;"
| 21
| December 10
| New York
| 
| Kyrie Irving (37)
| Tristan Thompson (9)
| Kyrie Irving (11)
| Quicken Loans Arena14,580
| 8–13
|- style="background:#cfc;"
| 22
| December 13
| @ Orlando
| 
| Kyrie Irving (31)
| Anderson Varejão (14)
| Jarrett Jack (6)
| Amway Center16,119
| 9–13
|- style="background:#fcc;"
| 23
| December 14
| @ Miami
| 
| Kyrie Irving (19)
| Anderson Varejão (8)
| Varejão & Jack (4)
| American Airlines Arena19,656
| 9–14
|- style="background:#fcc;"
| 24
| December 17
| Portland
| 
| Irving & Waiters (25)
| Bynum & Varejao (9)
| Kyrie Irving (10)
| Quicken Loans Arena15,689
| 9–15
|- style="background:#cfc;"
| 25
| December 20
| Milwaukee
| 
| Kyrie Irving (39)
| Tristan Thompson (15)
| Kyrie Irving (6)
| Quicken Loans Arena19,058
| 10–15
|- style="background:#fcc;"
| 26
| December 21
| @ Chicago
| 
| Andrew Bynum (19)
| Tristan Thompson (7)
| Jarrett Jack (6)
| United Center21,658
| 10–16
|- style="background:#fcc;"
| 27
| December 23
| Detroit
| 
| Kyrie Irving (21)
| Andrew Bynum (7)
| Kyrie Irving (7)
| Quicken Loans Arena19,215
| 10–17
|- style="background:#fcc;"
| 28
| December 26, 2013
| Atlanta
| 
| Kyrie Irving (40)
| Anderson Varejão (17)
| Kyrie Irving (9)
| Quicken Loans Arena18,682
| 10–18
|- style="background:#fcc;"
| 29
| December 28
| @ Boston
| 
| Kyrie Irving (32)
| Tyler Zeller (10)
| Jarrett Jack (4)
| TD Garden18,624
| 10–19
|- style="background:#fcc;"
| 30
| December 29
| Golden State
| 
| Kyrie Irving (27)
| Thompson & Varejao (12)
| Kyrie Irving (9)
| Quicken Loans Arena19,384
| 10–20
|- style="background:#fcc;"
| 31
| December 31
| @ Indiana
| 
| Anderson Varejão (14)
| Tristan Thompson (13)
| Jarrett Jack (6)
| Bankers Life Fieldhouse18,165
| 10–21

|- style="background:#cfc;"
| 32
| January 2
| Orlando
| 
| Anderson Varejão (18)
| Anderson Varejão (25)
| Jarrett Jack (7)
| Quicken Loans Arena14,248
| 11–21
|- style="background:#fcc;"
| 33
| January 4
| @ Brooklyn
| 
| Dion Waiters (26)
| Anderson Varejão (12)
| Jarrett Jack (7)
| Barclays Center17,732
| 11–22
|- style="background:#fcc;"
| 34
| January 5
| Indiana
| 
| C. J. Miles (21)
| Anderson Varejão (13)
| Dion Waiters (5)
| Quicken Loans Arena17,502
| 11–23
|- style="background:#cfc;"
| 35
| January 7
| Philadelphia
| 
| C. J. Miles (34)
| Anderson Varejão (14)
| Waiters & Irving (8)
| Quicken Loans Arena13,344
| 12–23
|- style="background:#cfc;"
| 36
| January 10
| @ Utah
| 
| Kyrie Irving (25)
| Tristan Thompson (15)
| Kyrie Irving (8)
| EnergySolutions Arena18,480
| 13–23
|- style="background:#fcc;"
| 37
| January 12
| @ Sacramento
| 
| C. J. Miles (14)
| Anderson Varejão (7)
| Anderson Varejão (6)
| Sleep Train Arena16,072
| 13–24
|- style="background:#cfc;"
| 38
| January 14
| @ L.A. Lakers
| 
| Luol Deng (27)
| Anderson Varejão (18)
| Anderson Varejão (6)
| Staples Center18,997
| 14–24
|- style="background:#fcc;"
| 39
| January 15
| @ Portland
| 
| Luol Deng (25)
| Anderson Varejão (14)
| Varejão & Irving (4)
| Moda Center19,998
| 14–25
|- style="background:#cfc;"
| 40
| January 17
| @ Denver
| 
| Kyrie Irving (23)
| Anderson Varejão (14)
| Anderson Varejão (7)
| Pepsi Center18,486
| 15–25
|- style="background:#fcc;"
| 41
| January 20
| Dallas
| 
| Kyrie Irving (26)
| Anderson Varejão (21)
| Kyrie Irving (9)
| Quicken Loans Arena18,762
| 15–26
|- style="background:#fcc;"
| 42
| January 22
| Chicago
| 
| Kyrie Irving (26)
| Anderson Varejão (11)
| three players (5)
| Quicken Loans Arena16,890
| 15–27
|- style="background:#cfc;"
| 43
| January 24
| Milwaukee
| 
| Anderson Varejão (16)
| Tristan Thompson (10)
| Kyrie Irving (10)
| Quicken Loans Arena17,147
| 16–27
|- style="background:#fcc;"
| 44
| January 26
| Phoenix
| 
| Kyrie Irving (24)
| Tristan Thompson (13)
| Kyrie Irving (9)
| Quicken Loans Arena15,872
| 16–28
|- style="background:#fcc;"
| 45
| January 28
| New Orleans
| 
| Kyrie Irving (23)
| Tyler Zeller (10)
| Kyrie Irving (5)
| Quicken Loans Arena13,985
| 16–29
|- style="background:#fcc;"
| 46
| January 30
| @ New York
| 
| Kyrie Irving (24)
| Luol Deng (11)
| Kyrie Irving (3)
| Madison Square Garden19,812
| 16–30

|- style="background:#fcc;"
| 47
| February 1
| @ Houston
| 
| Luol Deng (24)
| Tristan Thompson (7)
| Kyrie Irving (7)
| Toyota Center18,309
| 16–31
|- style="background:#fcc;"
| 48
| February 3
| @ Dallas
| 
| Kyrie Irving (27)
| Deng & Thompson (8)
| Irving & Jack (8)
| American Airlines Center19,595
| 16–32
|- style="background:#fcc;"
| 49
| February 5
| L.A. Lakers
| 
| C.J Miles (27)
| Anderson Varejão (13)
| Varejão & Dellavedova (5)
| Quicken Loans Arena15,205
| 16–33
|- style="background:#cfc;"
| 50
| February 7
| @ Washington
| 
| Dion Waiters (24)
| Tristan Thompson (8)
| Kyrie Irving (12)
| Verizon Center16,294
| 17–33
|- style="background:#cfc;"
| 51
| February 9
| Memphis
| 
| Kyrie Irving (28)
| Anderson Varejão (14)
| Irving & Waiters (6)
| Quicken Loans Arena16,484
| 18–33
|- style="background:#cfc;"
| 52
| February 11
| Sacramento
| 
| Luol Deng (22)
| Tristan Thompson (13)
| Dion Waiters (8)
| Quicken Loans Arena14,245
| 19–33
|- style="background:#cfc;"
| 53
| February 12
| @ Detroit
| 
| Tristan Thompson (25)
| Tristan Thompson (13)
| Jarrett Jack (8)
| Palace of Auburn Hills13,184
| 20–33
|- align="center"
|colspan="9" bgcolor="#bbcaff"|All-Star Break
|- style="background:#cfc;"
| 54
| February 18
| @ Philadelphia
| 
| Tyler Zeller (18)
| Tyler Zeller (15)
| Jarrett Jack (7)
| Wells Fargo Center12,904
| 21–33
|- style="background:#cfc;"
| 55
| February 19
| Orlando
| 
| Kyrie Irving (22)
| Tristan Thompson (14)
| Kyrie Irving (7)
| Quicken Loans Arena16,539
| 22–33
|- style="background:#fcc;"
| 56
| February 21
| @ Toronto
| 
| Luol Deng (21)
| Luol Deng (11)
| Kyrie Irving (9)
| Air Canada Centre18,854
| 22–34
|- style="background:#fcc;"
| 57
| February 23
| Washington
| 
| Luol Deng (17)
| Thompson & Hawes (12)
| Kyrie Irving (5)
| Quicken Loans Arena17,238
| 22–35
|- style="background:#fcc;"
| 58
| February 25
| Toronto
| 
| Kyrie Irving (25)
| Luol Deng (9)
| Kyrie Irving (9)
| Quicken Loans Arena13,758
| 22–36
|- style="background:#cfc;"
| 59
| February 26
| @ Oklahoma City
| 
| Kyrie Irving (31)
| Tristan Thompson (11)
| Kyrie Irving (9)
| Chesapeake Energy Arena18,203
| 23–36
|- style="background:#cfc;"
| 60
| February 28
| Utah
| 
| Kyrie Irving (21)
| Spencer Hawes (16)
| Kyrie Irving (12)
| Quicken Loans Arena18,601
| 24–36

|- style="background:#fcc;"
| 61
| March 1
| @ Memphis
| 
| Kyrie Irving (28)
| Tristan Thompson (8)
| Jarrett Jack (5)
| FedExForum17,011
| 24–37
|- style="background:#fcc;"
| 62
| March 4
| San Antonio
| 
| Irving & Waiters (24)
| Spencer Hawes (13)
| Matthew Dellavedova (7)
| Quicken Loans Arena17,966
| 24–38
|- style="background:#fcc;"
| 63
| March 7
| @ Charlotte
| 
| Deng & Waiters (19)
| Spencer Hawes (7)
| Jarrett Jack (6)
| Time Warner Cable Arena15,688
| 24–39
|- style="background:#fcc;"
| 64
| March 8
| New York
| 
| Kyrie Irving (30)
| Spencer Hawes (9)
| Kyrie Irving (8)
| Quicken Loans Arena20,562
| 24–40
|- style="background:#cfc;"
| 65
| March 12
| @ Phoenix
| 
| Kyrie Irving (23)
| Deng & Irving (9)
| Kyrie Irving (6)
| US Airways Center17,902
| 25–40
|- style="background:#cfc;"
| 66
| March 14
| @ Golden State
| 
| Spencer Hawes (22)
| Spencer Hawes (13)
| Jack, Irving & Waiters (4)
| Oracle Arena19,596
| 26–40
|- style="background:#fcc;"
| 67
| March 16
| @ L.A. Clippers
| 
| Luol Deng (23)
| Anderson Varejão (12)
| Jack & Waiters (5)
| Staples Center19,274
| 26–41
|- style="background:#fcc;"
| 68
| March 18
| Miami
| 
| Jarrett Jack (22)
| Anderson Varejão (11)
| Dion Waiters (11)
| Quicken Loans Arena20,562
| 26–42
|- style="background:#fcc;"
| 69
| March 20
| Oklahoma City
| 
| Dion Waiters (30)
| Tristan Thompson (10)
| Matthew Dellavedova (10)
| Quicken Loans Arena18,246
| 26–43
|- style="background:#fcc;"
| 70
| March 22
| Houston
| 
| Dion Waiters (26)
| Tristan Thompson (12)
| Matthew Dellavedova (10)
| Quicken Loans Arena19,058
| 26–44
|- style="background:#cfc;"
| 71
| March 23
| @ New York
| 
| Jarrett Jack (31)
| Hawes, Jack & Waiters (5)
| Jarrett Jack (10)
| Madison Square Garden19,812
| 27–44
|- style="background:#cfc;"
| 72
| March 25
| Toronto
| 
| Dion Waiters (24)
| Tristan Thompson (13)
| Deng & Waiters (7)
| Quicken Loans Arena15,497
| 28–44
|- style="background:#cfc;"
| 73
| March 26
| @ Detroit
| 
| Matthew Dellavedova (21)
| Anderson Varejão (16)
| Matthew Dellavedova (6)
| Palace of Auburn Hills15,979
| 29–44
|- style="background:#fcc;"
| 74
| March 28
| @ Brooklyn
| 
| Deng & Waiters (20)
| Anderson Varejão (13)
| Deng & Jack (7)
| Barclays Center17,732
| 29–45
|- style="background:#cfc;"
| 75
| March 30
| Indiana
| 
| Dion Waiters (19)
| Tristan Thompson (16)
| Jarrett Jack (9)
| Quicken Loans Arena17,147
| 30–45

|- style="background:#cfc;"
| 76
| April 2
| @ Orlando
| 
| Dion Waiters (26)
| Tristan Thompson (11)
| Kyrie Irving (8)
| Amway Center16,092
| 31–45
|- style="background:#fcc;"
| 77
| April 4, 2014
| @ Atlanta
| 
| Dion Waiters (23)
| Spencer Hawes (10)
| Hawes & Irving (4)
| Philips Arena16,210
| 31–46
|- style="background:#fcc;"
| 78
| April 5
| Charlotte
| 
| Kyrie Irving (44)
| Tristan Thompson (12)
| Kyrie Irving (8)
| Quicken Loans Arena18,179
| 31–47
|- style="background:#cfc;"
| 79
| April 9
| Detroit
| 
| Dion Waiters (22)
| Anderson Varejão (12)
| Matthew Dellavedova (10)
| Quicken Loans Arena15,979
| 32–47
|- style="background:#fcc;"
| 80
| April 11
| @ Milwaukee
| 
| Dion Waiters (23)
| Tristan Thompson (10)
| Dellavedova & Waiters (4)
| BMO Harris Bradley Center13,126
| 32–48
|- style="background:#fcc;"
| 81
| April 12
| Boston
| 
| Irving, Jack & Waiters (15)
| Thompson & Hawes (10)
| Jarrett Jack (6)
| Quicken Loans Arena18,456
| 32–49
|- style="background:#cfc;"
| 82
| April 16
| Brooklyn
| 
| Tyler Zeller (22)
| Tyler Zeller (11)
| Jarrett Jack (9)
| Quicken Loans Arena19,842
| 33–49

Player statistics

Regular season

|- align="center" bgcolor=""
|
| 71 || 71 || 35.2 || .430 || .358 ||.861 || 3.6 || 6.1 || 1.5 || .3 || 20.8
|- align="center" bgcolor="ffffff"
|
| 70 || 24 || 29.6 || .433 || .368 ||.685 || 2.8 || 3.0 || .9 || .2 || 15.9
|- align="center" bgcolor=""
|
| 40 || 40 || 33.8 || .417 || .315 ||.771 || 5.1 || 2.5 || 1.0 || .1 || 14.3
|- align="center" bgcolor="ffffff"
|
| 27 || 25 || 32.9 || .468 || .448 || .784 || 7.7 || 2.4 || .5 || 1.0 || 13.5
|- align="center" bgcolor=""
|
| 82 || 82 || 31.6 || .477 || .000 || .693 || 9.2 || .9 || .5 || .4 || 11.7
|- align="center" bgcolor=""
|
| 51 || 34 || 19.3 || .435 || .393 ||.853 || 2.0 || 1.0 || .9 || .3 || 9.9
|- align="center" bgcolor="ffffff"
|
| 80 || 31 || 28.2 || .410 || .341 || .839 || 2.8 || 4.1 || .7 || .3 || 9.5
|- align="center" bgcolor=""
|
| 65 || 29 || 27.7 || .495 || .000 ||.681 || 9.7 || 2.2 || 1.1 || .6 || 8.4
|- align="center" bgcolor="ffffff"
|
| 24 || 19 || 20.0 || .419 || .000 || .762 || 5.3 || 1.1 || .3 || 1.2 || 8.4
|- align="center" bgcolor=""
|
| 70 || 9 || 15.0 || .538 || .000 || .719 || 4.0 || .5 || .3 || .5 || 5.7
|- align="center" bgcolor="ffffff"
|
| 44 || 17 || 15.5 || .375 || .345 ||.583 || 2.8 || .4 || .4 || .4 || 5.2
|- align="center" bgcolor=""
|
| 72 || 4 || 17.7 || .412 || .368 || .792 || 1.7 || 2.6 || .5 || .1 || 4.7
|- align="center" bgcolor="ffffff"
|
| 52 || 0 || 12.8 || .356 || .245 || .638 || 3.0 || .3 || .4 || .2 || 4.2
|- align="center" bgcolor=""
|
| 65 || 24 || 15.7 || .415 || .328 ||.705 || 2.3 || .7 || .6 || .2 || 4.0
|- align="center" bgcolor="ffffff"
|
| 1 || 0 || 9.0 || .333 || 1.000 || .000 || 1.0 || .0 || 2.0 || .0 || 3.0
|- align="center" bgcolor=""
|
| 7 || 0 || 5.4 || .500 || .400 || .750 || .9 || .6 || .0 || .0 || 2.7
|- align="center" bgcolor="ffffff"
|
| 20 || 0 || 8.4 || .400 || .000 ||.571 || 2.8 || .3 || .3 || .4 || 2.2
|- align="center" bgcolor=""
|
| 20 || 1 || 7.1 || .343 || .211 || .900 || .7 || .3 || .1 || .0 || 1.7
|- align="center" bgcolor="ffffff"
|
| 2 || 0 || 6.0 || .343 || .000 || .000 || 1.0 || .0 || .0 || .0 || 1.0
|- align="center" bgcolor=""
|
| 2 || 0 || 3.5 || .000 || .000 || .500 || .0 || .5 || .5 || .0 || .5
|- align="center" bgcolor="ffffff"
|
| 2 || 0 || 2.5 || .000 || .000 || .000 || .5 || .0 || .0 || .0 || .0

|}

Through April 16, 2014

Awards, records and milestones

Awards

Week/Month
 December 16, 2013- Kyrie Irving won the Eastern Conference Player of the Week.

All-Star
 January 23, 2014- Kyrie Irving named Eastern Conference All-Star starter.
 February 16, 2014- Kyrie Irving is named the MVP of the 2014 NBA All-Star Game.

Records
 October 30, 2013- Anderson Varejão passed Jim Brewer for 7th all-time in rebounds as a Cavalier.
 November 2, 2013- Anderson Varejão passed Larry Nance for 6th all-time in rebounds as a Cavalier.
 November 6, 2013- Anderson Varejão passed Terrell Brandon for 13th all-time in minutes played as a Cavalier.
 December 4, 2013- Anderson Varejão passed Jim Brewer for 12th all-time in minutes played as a Cavalier.
 December 7, 2013- Kyrie Irving passed Antawn Jamison for 15th all-time in three-point field goals made played as a Cavalier.
 December 10, 2013- Kyrie Irving passed Lamond Murray for 14th all-time in three-point field goals made played as a Cavalier.
 December 14, 2013- Anderson Varejão passed Jim Brewer for 8th all-time in blocked shots as a Cavalier.
 December 26, 2013- Kyrie Irving passed Bob Sura for 13th all-time in three-point field goals made played as a Cavalier.
 December 28, 2013- Anderson Varejão passed Jim Chones for 5th all-time in rebounds as a Cavalier.
 December 28, 2013- Kyrie Irving passed Donyell Marshall for 12th all-time in three-point field goals made played as a Cavalier.
 January 2, 2014- Anderson Varejão grabbed 25 rebounds against the Orlando Magic to tie a team record set by Rick Roberson on March 4, 1972.
 January 5, 2014- Anderson Varejão passed LeBron James for 4th all-time in rebounds as a Cavalier.
 January 5, 2014- C. J. Miles made a team record 10 three-pointers against the Philadelphia 76ers.
 January 14, 2014- Kyrie Irving passed Anthony Parker for 11th all-time in three-point field goals made played as a Cavalier.
 January 20, 2014- Anderson Varejão passed John Bagley for 8th all-time in steals as a Cavalier.
 January 24, 2014- Anderson Varejão passed Jim Chones for 11th all-time in minutes played as a Cavalier.
 February 3, 2014- Anderson Varejão passed Craig Ehlo for 9th all-time in games played as a Cavalier;Kyrie Irving passed Terrell Brandon for 10th all-time in three-point field goals made played as a Cavalier.
 April 16, 2014- Mike Brown passed Bill Fitch for 2nd all-time in coaching wins as a Cavalier.

Team records
 November 4, 2013- Tied team record for longest streak of holding opponents under 95 points to start a season- 4 games.
 January 2, 2014- The Cavs played in their third overtime game in a row at home for the first time in team history.
 February 5, 2014- Set a Quicken Loans Arena record with 27 offensive rebounds against the Los Angeles Lakers.
 April 5, 2014- In a loss to the Charlotte Hornets the Cavs tied a team record with their eighth overtime game in a season.

Milestones
 October 30, 2013- C. J. Miles scored his 4,000th career point.
 November 2, 2013- Earl Clark played in his 200th career game.
 November 4, 2013- C. J. Miles made his 1,500th career field goal.
 November 8, 2013- Jarrett Jack made his 1,500th career free throw.
 November 9, 2013- Jarrett Jack became the first reserve player since Tom Gugliotta in 1995 to put up 20 points, four rebounds, five assists, three steals and three blocks in a game.
 November 11, 2013- Dion Waiters scored his 1,000th career point.
 November 16, 2013- Kyrie Irving made his 200th career three-point field goal.
 November 20, 2013- Andrew Bynum played in his 400th career game.
 November 22, 2013- Alonzo Gee recorded in his 250th career steal.
 December 13, 2013- Kyrie Irving made his 1,000th career field goal.
 December 14, 2013- Alonzo Gee scored in his 2,000th career point.
 December 17, 2013- Jarrett Jack scored his 7,000th career point.
 December 21, 2013- Jarrett Jack made his 2,500th career field goal.
 December 23, 2013- Earl Clark scored his 1,000th career point.
 December 26, 2013- Anderson Varejão made his 1,500th career field goal.
 December 28, 2013- Jarrett Jack recorded in his 500th career steal.
 December 31, 2013- Anderson Varejão played in his 500th career game.
 January 4, 2014- C. J. Miles made his 500th career three-point field goal.
 January 10, 2014- Kyrie Irving scored his 3,000th career point.
 January 14, 2013- Luol Deng made his 4,000th career field goal.
 January 30, 2014- Jarrett Jack made his 500th career three-point field goal; Tristan Thompson scored his 2,000th career point.
 February 1, 2014- Luol Deng made his 400th career three-point field goal.
 February 3, 2014- Anderson Varejão became fourth player to record 4,000 points and 4,000 rebounds as a Cavalier and he achieved both milestones on the same night.
 February 7, 2014- C. J. Miles played in his 500th career game.
 February 21, 2014- Spencer Hawes grabbed his 3,000th career rebound in his first game as a Cavalier.
 February 26, 2014- Spencer Hawes made his 200th career three-point field goal.
 March 7, 2014- Kyrie Irving recorded his 1,000th career assist.
 March 8, 2014- Spencer Hawes made his 500th career free throw.
 March 25, 2014- Mike Brown became the third coach to pick up his 300th win as a Cavalier.
 April 2, 2014- Spencer Hawes made his 2,000th career field goal; Tristan Thompson made his 500th career free throw.
 April 12, 2014- Alonzo Gee grabbed his 1,000th career rebound.
 April 16, 2014- Kyrie Irving recorded his 250th career steal; Spencer Hawes played in his 500th career game. Dion Waiters scored his 2,000th career point;Tyler Zeller scored his 1,000th career point.

Team milestones
 November 4, 2013- Team had at least 12 blocks and 10 steals in a game for the first time since March 16, 2004 (Chicago Bulls).
 November 11, 2013- Team had back-to-back games of at least 10 blocks for the first time since December 6, 2008.
 December 7, 2013- Held the Los Angeles Clippers to .322 shooting, the lowest percentage against the Cavs since November 18, 2003 (also against the Clippers).
 December 20, 2013- Scored 107 points for the fifth straight game, the most in a row since December 28, 1993.

Injuries, surgeries and absences
 Carrick Felix missed the first nine games of the season due to a sports hernia.
 Andrew Bynum did not play in the second game of back-to-backs due to a knee injury at the beginning of the season; missed two games in November due to personal reasons.
 Dion Waiters missed two games in mid-November due to illness.
 C. J. Miles missed four games in late-November due to a right calf strain.
 Tyler Zeller missed two games in late-November due to a right ankle sprain.
 Carrick Felix missed two games in mid-December due to right knee soreness.
 Anthony Bennett missed two games in mid-December due to illness.
 Dion Waiters missed three games in late-December due to right wrist tendinitis.
 Kyrie Irving missed three games in early January due to a left knee contusion.
 Jarrett Jack missed two games in mid-January due to lower back spasms.
 In late January it was announced that Carrick Felix would miss six to eight weeks with a stress fracture of the left knee (missed 37 games).
 Anderson Varejão missed three games in late-January/early-February with a knee bruise.
 Anderson Varejão missed 12 games in mid-February/early-March with a sore back
 Dion Waiters missed seven games in mid-February/early-March due to a hyperextended left knee
 C. J. Miles missed the final 26 games of the season due to a left ankle sprain.
 Luol Deng missed three games in mid-March due to a left ankle sprain.
 Kyrie Irving missed eight games in mid-March until late March due to a left biceps strain.
 Sergey Karasev missed five games in late March due to right knee patellar tendonitis.
 Anthony Bennett missed 17 games from mid-March until mid-April with a left patellar tendon strain.
 Luol Deng missed three games in mid-April due to lower back soreness.

Transactions

Preseason

Overview

Free agents

In season

Overview

Trades

References

External links
 

Cleveland Cavaliers seasons
Cleveland Cavaliers Season, 2013-14
2013 in sports in Ohio
2014 in sports in Ohio